The Philippine Senate Committee on Ethics and Privileges is a standing committee of the Senate of the Philippines.

Jurisdiction 
According to the Rules of the Senate, the committee handles all matters relating to the conduct, rights, privileges, safety, dignity, integrity and reputation of the Senate and its members.

The committee receives and hears ethics complaints against a senator filed by either another senator, a government official, or a Filipino citizen.

Members, 18th Congress 
Based on the Rules of the Senate, the Senate Committee on Ethics and Privileges has 7 members.

The President Pro Tempore, the Majority Floor Leader, and the Minority Floor Leader are ex officio members.

Here are the members of the committee in the 18th Congress as of September 24, 2020:

Committee secretary: Ethel Hope Dignadice-Villaflor

See also 

 List of Philippine Senate committees

References 

Ethics
Ethics organizations